Anton Niklas Sundberg (27 May 1818, Uddevalla – 2 February 1900) was a Lutheran clergyman, and the Church of Sweden archbishop of Uppsala 1870–1900.

Biography
He acquired a doctor of philosophy and theology degree at Uppsala University in 1842, became dean and was ordained  a priest in 1845. He then undertook travel through Europe in 1849–50. He was a lecturer in theology at  Lund University in 1849 and from 1852 to 1856 a professor of dogmatics and moral theology.
From 1856 to 1864 he was professor of church history and symbolism at the university. In 1861 he was appointed vicar in Lund before being appointed bishop of the Diocese of Karlstad  in 1864. In 1870, he became Archbishop  of Uppsala  and Pro-Chancellor of Uppsala University. Sundberg was a member of the Swedish Academy from 1874 and of the Royal Swedish Academy of Sciences from 1877.

References

Other sources
 Article Sundberg, A.N. From Svenskt biografiskt handlexikon 
 Anton Niklas Sundberg, from Bilder och minnen, by Harald Wieselgren, 1889

Related reading
Bexell, Oloph  (2003) Sveriges kyrkohistoria. 7, Folkväckelsens och kyrkoförnyelsens tid (Verbum, Stockholm) 
  

1818 births
1900 deaths
People from Uddevalla Municipality
Lutheran archbishops of Uppsala
Bishops of Karlstad
19th-century Lutheran archbishops
Members of the Swedish Academy
Members of the Royal Swedish Academy of Sciences
Speakers of Första kammaren
Members of the Första kammaren
Speakers of Andra kammaren
Burials at Uppsala old cemetery